In molecular biology, glycoside hydrolase family 45 is a family of glycoside hydrolases.

Glycoside hydrolases  are a widespread group of enzymes that hydrolyse the glycosidic bond between two or more carbohydrates, or between a carbohydrate and a non-carbohydrate moiety. A classification system for glycoside hydrolases, based on sequence similarity, has led to the definition of >100 different families. This classification is available on the CAZy web site, and also discussed at CAZypedia, an online encyclopedia of carbohydrate active enzymes.

Glycoside hydrolase family 45 CAZY GH_45 comprises enzymes with only one known activity; endoglucanase. This family is also known as cellulase family K. The best conserved region in these enzymes is located in the N-terminal section. It contains an aspartic acid residue which has been shown to act as a nucleophile in the catalytic mechanism. This also has several cysteines that are involved in forming disulphide bridges.

References 

EC 3.2.1
GH family
Protein families